Geovane is a given name. It may refer to:

 Geovane Fernández (born 1982), Uruguayan racing cyclist
 Geovane (footballer, born 1985), José Thomaz Geovane de Oliveira, Brazilian football forward
 Geovane (footballer, born 1989), Geovane Batista de Faria, Brazilian football midfielder
 Geovane Maranhão (born 1989), Geovane Diniz Silva, Brazilian football forward
 Geovane (footballer, born 1992), Geovane Batista Loubo, Brazilian football midfielder
 Geovane Magno (born 1994), Geovane Magno Cândido Silveira, Brazilian football attacking midfielder
 Geovane (footballer, born 1996), Geovane Henrique Pereira de Souza, Brazilian football right-back
 Geovane (footballer, born 1998), Geovane Nascimento Silva, Brazilian football midfielder
 Geovane (footballer, born March 1999), Geovane da Silva de Souza, Brazilian football midfielder
 Giva (footballer, born 1999), Geovane Silva Santos, Brazilian football midfielder

See also
 Giovanni (disambiguation)